Penny Edwards is a Welsh cyclist. She represented Wales in the MTB and Road Race at the 2002 Commonwealth Games in Manchester. She is also a solicitor who has worked in Cardiff, New Zealand and London. Edwards competed with the Women's GB Cycling Squad in World Cup Races in Spain, Italy, France and Canada, including the Giro d'Italia and Grande Boucle.

2003
1st Welsh National Cyclo-cross Championships

References

Year of birth missing (living people)
Living people
Welsh female cyclists
Commonwealth Games competitors for Wales
Cyclists at the 1998 Commonwealth Games
Place of birth missing (living people)